Tawargera  is a Town Panchayat in the southern state of Karnataka, India. It is located in the Kushtagi taluk of Koppal district in Karnataka.

Demographics
As of 2001 India census, Tawargera had a population of 13652 with 6965 males and 6687 females.

See also
 Koppal
 Districts of Karnataka

References

External links
 http://Koppal.nic.in/

Villages in Koppal district